Yuliya Feodorovna Platonova or Julia Platonova (née Garder, 1841—1892) was a Russian soprano, known for performances at Imperial Theatres in St. Petersburg. She is considered as one of the most important figures that created Russian opera, at a whole. Music teacher.

Repertory 
Among more than 50 of her roles, the most notable were the following:
 Antonida (A Life for the Tsar),
 Elvira (I puritani),
 Natasha (Rusalka),
 Lyudmila (Ruslan and Lyudmila), 
 Adalgisa (Norma),
 Elsa (Lohengrin),
 Maria (William Ratcliff),
 Berthe (Le prophète),
 Halka (Halka),
 Mařenka (The Bartered Bride),
 Dasha (The Power of the Fiend),
 Valentine (Les Huguenots),
 Donna Anna (The Stone Guest),
 Donna Anna (Don Giovanni),
 Olga (The Maid of Pskov),
 Marina Mnishek (Boris Godunov),
 Elisabeth (Tannhäuser).

Notes

References 

1841 births
Musicians from Riga
Russian operatic sopranos
19th-century women opera singers from the Russian Empire
1892 deaths